Leland Huffield Dunham (June 9, 1902 – May 11, 1961) was a first baseman in Major League Baseball. He played for the Philadelphia Phillies in 1926.

Biography
Dunham was born in Atlanta, Illinois. After attending college, he started his professional baseball career in 1925 with the Binghamton Triplets of the New York-Pennsylvania League. He batted .334, which was the highest on his team.

The following season, Dunham earned a roster spot with the Philadelphia Phillies. He got into five games in April and May, getting one hit and driving in one run in four at-bats. He finished the season with the Virginia League's Wilson Bugs and batted .300 for them.

Dunham played until 1932. Over 910 career minor league games, he had 1,024 hits and a .310 batting average.

Dunham died in 1961, in Atlanta, Illinois, at the age of 58.

References

External links

Baseball Almanac

1902 births
1961 deaths
Major League Baseball first basemen
Philadelphia Phillies players
Binghamton Triplets players
Wilson Bugs players
York White Roses players
Springfield Senators players
Baseball players from Illinois
People from Atlanta, Illinois
County judges in the United States